The Yahtse River (Tlingit Yas'ei Héen) is a short glacier outlet stream extending from the Malaspina Glacier to the Pacific Ocean. The river formerly served as a primary outlet stream for the western portion of the Malaspina. Following the retreat of the Icy Bay glaciers in the 20th century the outlet of the Malaspina shifted to the Caetani River draining into Icy Bay, and the Yahtse was almost completely abandoned by the early 21st century.

References

Rivers of Alaska
Rivers of Yakutat City and Borough, Alaska